Reggiana may refer to:

 A.C. Reggiana 1919, a football club
 ASDCF Reggiana, a women's football club
 Pallacanestro Reggiana, a basketball club
 Reggiana cattle, a cattle breed